Süreyya Özkefe (born 1939) is a Turkish footballer. He played in nine matches for the Turkey national football team from 1961 to 1965.

References

1939 births
Living people
Turkish footballers
Turkey international footballers
Place of birth missing (living people)
Association footballers not categorized by position